Macew (German 1939-1945 Weide)  is a village in the administrative district of Gmina Gołuchów, within Pleszew County, Greater Poland Voivodeship, in west-central Poland.

References

Macew